Darryl Harris may refer to:

 Darryl Harris (guard) (born 1985), American football guard
 Darryl Harris (running back) (born 1966), American football running back